Plecodus is a genus of cichlids endemic to Lake Tanganyika in Africa. They feed on scales.

Species
There are currently four recognized species in this genus:
 Plecodus elaviae Poll, 1949
 Plecodus multidentatus Poll, 1952
 Plecodus paradoxus Boulenger, 1898
 Plecodus straeleni Poll, 1948

References 

 
Perissodini
Cichlid genera
Taxa named by George Albert Boulenger
Taxonomy articles created by Polbot